101 Collins Street is a  skyscraper located in Collins Street, Melbourne central business district, Victoria, Australia. The 57-storey building designed by Denton Corker Marshall was completed in March 1991. Towards the end of project, with a change of developer, the foyer space was designed by John Burgee, noted as a pioneer of postmodern architecture.

It overtook Rialto Towers and became the tallest building in Melbourne and Australia until August 1991, when 120 Collins Street was completed. As of 2022, the tower is the sixth-tallest building in Melbourne and the 11th-tallest building in Australia when measured up to the tallest architectural point, which is the -tall spire.

The tower contains  of rentable space. There are 414 underground car park spaces. The building contains double glazed windows with surface coated tempered glass to increase thermal efficiency. The CRA Building was demolished for the construction of this building.

The owners of 101 Collins have had a long term policy of buying up surrounding properties in order to protect their views, especially to the south, with an unintended consequence being that older buildings in Flinders Lane now house hip restaurants and bars.

101 Collins Street lends its name to a Yarra Trams stop that is served by routes 11, 12, 48 and 109.

See also

 List of tallest buildings in Melbourne
 List of tallest buildings in Australia

References

External links
 Official Website

Skyscrapers in Melbourne
Office buildings in Melbourne
1991 establishments in Australia
Skyscraper office buildings in Australia
Office buildings completed in 1991
Collins Street, Melbourne
Buildings and structures in Melbourne City Centre